Ahmed Daghim (born 7 April 2001) is a Danish-Palestinian professional footballer who plays as winger for B.93.

Club career

Copenhagen
Daghim first played in Humlebæk Boldklub, before moving to Frederiksberg-based club FA 2000 and later B.93 in the Copenhagen neighbourhood of Østerbro, before joining the football school of FC Copenhagen in 2012. He made his senior debut on 27 September 2018 in a Danish Cup match against Viby IF, which ended in a 0–3 win for Copenhagen. In the match, he came on as a substitute in the 76th minute for Pieros Sotiriou. On 10 February 2019, Daghim made his Danish Superliga debut in a 6–1 win over OB. Although he was only utilised twice in the championship round in the following years, he still won the Danish league title with Copenhagen.

Loan to HamKam
On 20 December 2019, Copenhagen confirmed that Daghim had extended his contract until 2023 and would join Norwegian club HamKam on loan for 2020. He made his debut for the club on 3 July 2020 in a 2–3 loss to Kongsvinger, after football activities had been resumed as part of the COVID-19 pandemic. Later that week, he made his first start in a 2–0 loss to Lillestrøm. He returned to Copenhagen after the season, as HamKam finished in a disappointing 9th place of the second-tier Norwegian First Division.

Kolding IF
Daghim signed a two-and-a-half-year contract with Danish second-tier club Kolding IF on 21 January 2021. Following the move, Copenhagen sporting director William Kvist stated: "Ahmed is a talented player, but he still had a long way to go before he would become a candidate for permanent playing time with us." Daghim made his debut for the club on 12 February, coming on as a second-half substitute for fellow January-signing Matthias Verreth in a league match against Helsingør.

On 21 August, during Kolding's 2nd Division match against FA 2000 at the Frederiksberg Idrætspark in Frederiksberg, Daghim collapsed while warming up shortly after the beginning of the second half. A doctor was present among the spectators, who oversaw Daghim, before an ambulance transported him to Bispebjerg Hospital. The match was suspended following the incident, and Kolding IF wrote on their official Twitter account that Daghim was "fine under the circumstances".

His contract got terminated by request on 5 July 2022.

B.93
On 8 July 2022, Daghim signed for B.93.

International career
Born in Denmark, Daghim is of Palestinian descent. He is a youth international for Denmark.

Honours
Copenhagen
Danish Superliga: 2018–19

References

External links
Ahmed Daghim at DBU

2001 births
Living people
Danish men's footballers
Denmark youth international footballers
Danish people of Palestinian descent
Danish expatriate men's footballers
Danish Superliga players
Danish 1st Division players
Danish 2nd Division players
FA 2000 players
F.C. Copenhagen players
Hamarkameratene players
Kolding IF players
Boldklubben af 1893 players
Association football midfielders
Danish expatriate sportspeople in Norway
Expatriate footballers in Norway
Footballers from Copenhagen
Norwegian First Division players